To Kill a King is the eponymous second studio album by English band To Kill a King. It was released in March 2015 under Xtra Mile Recordings.

Track listing

References

2015 albums
Xtra Mile Recordings albums